Mordellistena praesagita is a species of beetle in the genus Mordellistena of the family Mordellidae. It was described by Kangas in 1988.

References

Beetles described in 1988
praesagita